The 1938 Doncaster by-election was held on 17 November 1938.  The by-election was held due to the death of the incumbent Labour MP, Alfred Short.  It was won by the Labour candidate John Morgan.

References

1938 elections in the United Kingdom
1938 in England
1930s in Yorkshire
Politics of Doncaster
By-elections to the Parliament of the United Kingdom in South Yorkshire constituencies